Jonathan Chan Fan Keng (born 10 May 1997) is a Singaporean former diver. He competed in the 2020 Summer Olympics after his qualification through a victory in the 2019 Asian Diving Cup in Kuala Lumpur, Malaysia on 8 September 2019. He is the first Singaporean diver to have qualified for the Olympic Games. Due to his Olympic qualification, Chan was nominated for the Straits Times Athlete of the Year award in 2020.

Diving career
Chan has been doing gymnastics since five years old and has cited local gymnast Hoe Wah Toon as his inspiration. He switched over to diving, following after his older sister, Kimberly Chan, who was scouted as a prospective diver, since there was only a year left to train in the lead up to the 2010 Summer Youth Olympics that was held in Singapore.

Chan started diving competitively since 2013. 

In 2019, Chan won the Men's 10m Platform final at the Asian Diving Cup in Kuala Lumpur, Malaysia and became the first Singaporean diver to qualify for the Olympics. At the 2020 Summer Olympics at Japan, Chan was placed 26th out of 29 divers and failed to qualify for the semi-finals.

At the 2021 Southeast Asian Games, Chan with his partner Max Lee, won the silver medal in the 10 m synchro event. Chan retired from diving after the SEA Games to pursue a career in the design industry.

Early life and education 
Chan studied at the Anglo-Chinese School (Independent) and the Singapore University of Technology and Design.

Major competition results

References

External links
 

Singaporean divers
1997 births
Living people
Singaporean sportspeople of Chinese descent
Divers at the 2014 Summer Youth Olympics
Competitors at the 2015 Southeast Asian Games
Competitors at the 2017 Southeast Asian Games
Divers at the 2018 Asian Games
Southeast Asian Games silver medalists for Singapore
Southeast Asian Games bronze medalists for Singapore
Olympic divers of Singapore
Divers at the 2020 Summer Olympics
Competitors at the 2021 Southeast Asian Games
Southeast Asian Games medalists in diving